The Newark Orioles were a baseball team, who played in the New York–Penn League from 1983–1987. They played their home games at Colburn Park in Newark, New York.

References

Baltimore Orioles minor league affiliates
Baseball teams established in 1983
Baseball teams disestablished in 1987
Defunct New York–Penn League teams
Defunct minor league baseball teams
1983 establishments in New York (state)
Defunct baseball teams in New York (state)
1987 disestablishments in New York (state)